The 1984 United States House of Representatives elections was an election for the United States House of Representatives on November 6, 1984, to elect members to serve in the 99th United States Congress. They coincided with the re-election of President Ronald Reagan in a landslide. This victory also yielded gains for Reagan's Republican Party in the House, where they picked up a net of sixteen seats from the Democratic Party. Despite Reagan's extremely large electoral victory, the Democrats nonetheless retained a commanding majority in the House and actually gained seats in the Senate. These elections were the last until 2020 when a member of a political party other than the Democrats, Republicans, or an independent had one or more seats in the chamber.

This would be the last time for eight years that the Democrats experienced a net loss of seats in the House.

Overall results

Retiring incumbents 
Twenty-two representatives retired. Sixteen of those seats were held by the same party, six seats changed party.

Democrats 
Nine Democrats retired. Four of those seats were held by Democrats and five were won by Republicans.

Democratic held 
 : Paul Simon: to run for U.S. Senate. Was succeeded by Kenneth J. Gray.
 : James Shannon: to run for U.S. Senate. Was succeeded by Chester G. Atkins.
 : Geraldine Ferraro: to run for Vice President. Was succeeded by Thomas J. Manton.
 : Al Gore: to run for U.S. Senate. Was succeeded by Bart Gordon.

Republican gain 
 : Raymond P. Kogovsek. Was succeeded by Michael L. Strang.
 : Tom Harkin: to run for U.S. Senate. Was succeeded by Jim Ross Lightfoot.
 : Norman D'Amours: to run for U.S. Senate. Was succeeded by Robert C. Smith.
 : Richard Ottinger. Was succeeded by Joseph J. DioGuardi.
 : Kent Hance: to run for U.S. Senate. Was succeeded by Larry Combest.

Republicans 
Twelve Republicans retired. Eleven of those seats were held by Republicans and one was won by a Democrat.

Republican held 
 : Jack Edwards. Was succeeded by Sonny Callahan.
 : John N. Erlenborn. Was succeeded by Harris W. Fawell.
 : Tom Corcoran: to run for U.S. Senate. Was succeeded by John E. Grotberg.
 : Larry Winn. Was succeeded by Jan Meyers.
 : Harold S. Sawyer. Was succeeded by Paul B. Henry.
 : Barber Conable. Was succeeded by Fred J. Eckert.
 : James G. Martin: to run for Governor of North Carolina. Was succeeded by Alex McMillan.
 : Phil Gramm: to run for U.S. Senate. Was succeeded by Joe Barton.
 : Ron Paul: to run for U.S. Senate. Was succeeded by Tom DeLay.
 : David Daniel Marriott: to run for Governor of Utah. Was succeeded by David Smith Monson.
 : J. Kenneth Robinson. Was succeeded by D. French Slaughter Jr.
 : Joel Pritchard. Was succeeded by John Miller.

Democratic gain 
 : Ed Bethune: to run for U.S. Senate. Was succeeded by Tommy F. Robinson.

Defeated incumbents

In primary election

Democrats 
Three Democrats lost renomination.

 : Katie Hall lost to challenger Pete Visclosky.
 : Frank G. Harrison lost to challenger Paul E. Kanjorski.
 : Abraham Kazen lost to challenger Albert Bustamante.

In the general election

Democrats 
Thirteen Democrats lost re-election.

: James F. McNulty Jr. lost to Jim Kolbe.
: Jerry M. Patterson lost to Bob Dornan.
: William R. Ratchford lost to John G. Rowland.
: Elliott H. Levitas lost to Pat Swindall.
: Clarence Long lost to Helen Delich Bentley.
: Donald J. Albosta lost to Bill Schuette.
: Joseph Minish lost to Dean Gallo.
: Ike Franklin Andrews lost to Bill Cobey.
: Charles Robin Britt lost to Howard Coble.
: James M. Clarke lost to Bill Hendon.
: Jack Hightower lost to Beau Boulter.
: William Neff Patman lost to Mac Sweeney.
: Tom Vandergriff lost to Dick Armey.

Republicans 
Three Republicans lost re-election.

: George V. Hansen lost to Richard H. Stallings.
: Dan Crane lost to Terry L. Bruce.
: Lyle Williams lost to Jim Traficant.

Special elections 
There were three special elections to the 98th Congress in 1984, two of which were held on the same day as the general election for the next term.

Elections are sorted here by date then district.

Alabama

Alaska

Arizona

Arkansas

California

Colorado

Connecticut

Delaware

Florida

Georgia

Hawaii

Idaho

Illinois

Indiana

Iowa

Kansas

Kentucky

Louisiana

Maine

Maryland

Massachusetts

Michigan

Minnesota

Mississippi

Missouri

Montana

Nebraska

Nevada

New Hampshire

New Jersey

New Mexico

New York

North Carolina

North Dakota

Ohio

Oklahoma

Oregon

Pennsylvania

Rhode Island

South Carolina

South Dakota

Tennessee

Texas

Utah

Vermont

Virginia

Washington

West Virginia

Wisconsin 

|-
| 
| Les Aspin
|  | Democratic
| 1970
| Incumbent re-elected.
| nowrap | 

|-
| 
| Robert Kastenmeier
|  | Democratic
| 1958
| Incumbent re-elected.
| nowrap | 

|-
| 
| Steve Gunderson
|  | Republican
| 1980
| Incumbent re-elected.
| nowrap | 

|-
| 
| Jerry Kleczka
|  | Democratic
| 1984
| Incumbent re-elected.
| nowrap | 

|-
| 
| Jim Moody
|  | Democratic
| 1982
| Incumbent re-elected.
| nowrap | 

|-
| 
| Tom Petri
|  | Republican
| 1979 
| Incumbent re-elected.
| nowrap | 

|-
| 
| Dave Obey
|  | Democratic
| 1969 
| Incumbent re-elected.
| nowrap | 

|-
| 
| Toby Roth
|  | Republican
| 1978
| Incumbent re-elected.
| nowrap | 

|-
| 
| Jim Sensenbrenner
|  | Republican
| 1978
| Incumbent re-elected.
| nowrap | 

|}

Wyoming

See also 

 1984 United States elections
 1984 United States gubernatorial elections
 1984 United States presidential election
 1984 United States Senate elections
 98th United States Congress
 99th United States Congress

Notes

References 
 Federal Elections 84: Election Results for U.S. President, the U.S. Senate, and the U.S. House of Representatives. Washington, D.C.: Federal Election Commission. 1985. pp. 27–118. Archived from the original on November 5, 2021.